Jordi López Caravaca (born 14 August 1998) is a Spanish cyclist, who currently rides for UCI ProTeam .

Major results
2021
 5th Trofeo Calvià
 7th Overall Volta ao Alentejo
2023
 1st Stage 2 Tour de Taiwan

References

External links

1998 births
Living people
Spanish male cyclists
People from Badalona
Sportspeople from the Province of Barcelona
Cyclists from Catalonia
21st-century Spanish people